Tašmajdan Sports and Recreation Center (abbr. Tašmajdan SRC), commonly known simply as Taš, is a sporting and recreational center located in the city of Belgrade, Serbia. It was founded by the Assembly of the City of Belgrade in 1958.

At within the center located of the outdoor Tašmajdan Stadium, the Aleksandar Nikolić Hall, the Pionir Ice Hall and a complex of outdoor and indoor swimming pools.

Tašmajdan Stadium 

Construction of the stadium began in 1952. Built with white stone from Brač island, and opened on 24 January 1954, by mid 2000s the stadium began showing signs of structural deterioration. Architect Mihajlo Janković, was awarded the Belgrade's October award for architecture, the highest city award at the time, for the Tašmajdan project. Originally, the sports complex started as the ice factory, where people could buy the so-called "hygienic ice".

When opened, the stadium wasn't fully finished, but already in 1954 it hosted volleyball, basketball, and tennis matches. Some of the best known happenings in the venue include: EuroBasket Women 1954, first Miss Yugoslavia contest in 1957 (won by Tonka Katunarić), 1957 World Women's Handball Championship (the inaugural world women championship), concerts of Alexandrov Ensemble in 1958 and later in the 1960s and 1970s of Mazowsze, Elton John, Ray Charles and Tina Turner and ice hockey matches with over 10,000 spectators. Yugoslav national tennis team played the Davis Cup matches in 1956 in Tašmajdan and the curiosities held in the facility include the chess with live figures, the football matches played by the Zastava 750 cars and the first Spanish corrida in Europe outside of Spain, when Luis Miguel Dominguín performed in September 1971. Tašmajdan hosted the first FINA World Aquatics Championships in 1973.

After the 1977-1978 season, the ice skating rink was dismantled in March 1978. Bad conditions of the facility in the 2000s led many public personalities in Belgrade (Cane Kostić, Neda Arnerić, Branko Cvejić) to urge the city government to do something about it. In mid-April 2009, the initiative called "Taš je naš" ("Taš is ours") was held to draw public attention to the sad state of the crumbling facility. In the summer of 2009 the stadium was closed to the public due to the impending reconstruction. An extensive RSD550 million renovation began in September 2011. Originally, the reconstruction was to be finished in December 2012, then was postponed to 2014 and was finally completed in 2016. As the object is under the protection, the conceptual solution for the reconstruction had to fully preserve the original author's concept. Since December 2016, the ice skating rink became operational again during the winter.

Pionir Sports Complex

Aleksandar Nikolić Hall 

The hall, designed by Ljiljana and Dragomir Bakić, was opened on 24 May 1973 as the Pionir Hall. It was later renamed after Aleksandar Nikolić, "father of Yugoslav basketball". The interior was completely refurbished in 2019 and enlarged to 8,000 seats.

Pionir Ice Hall

Swimming pools

Outdoor swimming pool 

The outdoor swimming pool was opened on 25 June 1961. Its capacity is 2,500, and swimming beaches hold around 3,500 people, for the total of 6,000, including the activation of telescopic bleachers.

Reconstruction of the pool began on 10 March 2020, after the works on the stadium were finished. The works should be completed in June 2020.

Indoor swimming pool 

The indoor swimming pool was opened on 13 December 1968. The pool's dimensions are 50 × 20 m. The capacity for spectators is 2,000 seats. Within the same building there is a recreation center, a gym, a small swimming pool and a hotel named Taš.

Notable basketball matches

Concerts

Over the decades, the open air stadium has hosted a variety of acts in late spring and summer from May to September:

Other
 September 8, 1981 – Jeux sans frontières (Inter-European game show, 1981 International Final)
 June 1, 2013 – 2012–13 LEN Champions League Final Four (VK Crvena zvezda won the title in front of 4,000 fans)

References

External links 
 

Swimming venues in Serbia
Buildings and structures in Belgrade
Sports venues in Belgrade
Water polo venues
1954 establishments in Serbia
Sports venues completed in 1954
Palilula, Belgrade